Gretillat or Grétillat is a surname. Notable people with the surname include: 

Augustin Gretillat (1837–1894), Swiss Protestant pastor, theologian, and professor
Jacques Grétillat (1885–1950), French actor and film director